Bienert is a surname. Notable people with the surname include: 

Gerhard Bienert (1898–1986), German actor
Patrick Bienert (born 1980), German photographer
Richard Bienert (1881–1949), Czech police officer and politician
Theophil Joachim Heinrich Bienert (1833–1873), German botanist